See's Candies is an American manufacturer and distributor of candy, particularly chocolates. It was founded by Charles See, his wife Florence, and his mother Mary in Los Angeles, California in 1921. The company is now headquartered in South San Francisco, California. See's kitchens are located at its headquarters and maintained at its original factory in Los Angeles, where there are also retail shops. It also has an office in Carson, California.   The company has been owned by Warren Buffett's Berkshire Hathaway Corporation since 1972.

Location and market area
The See's Candy company primarily vends its products in its own stores, and those of fellow Berkshire Hathaway subsidiary Nebraska Furniture Mart. See's candies are also available at its stores in a number of airports in the United States. See's Candies operates over 200 stores in the following U.S. states: Arizona, Arkansas, California, Colorado, Hawaii, Idaho, Illinois, Indiana, Massachusetts, Minnesota, New Mexico, New York, Nevada, Ohio, Oklahoma, Oregon, Tennessee, Texas, Utah, Washington There are also stores outside the U.S. in Hong Kong, Taiwan, Singapore, and South Korea, taking advantage of the proximity of the plant to San Francisco International Airport. Seasonallyprimarily during the year-end holiday shopping seasonSee's also offers its product in select markets in kiosks at malls and other shopping centers. See's also has an online store.

See's markets its product outside these areas via mail order catalog, in order to control the age of its product. The candies are also available through online orders, and links to the candy company's site can be found on Walmart.com and similar internet stores. Through an arrangement with Costco, coupons for boxes of candies may be purchased at the warehouse outlets and redeemed at See's stores or by mail. Coupons are also sold in fundraising efforts.

On March 28, 2020, See's Candies suspended operations citing the current COVID-19 pandemic and stated it had closed all of its stores until further notice. This was the first time the company had shut down operations since WWII, when it became difficult to acquire sugar and other ingredients due to the war effort.  In May 2020, See's Candies reopened both their Los Angeles and San Francisco candy kitchens with safety precautions in-place.   On-line sales resumed and contact-free pick-up became available in certain locations.

In 2020, See's Candies opened a store in Abu Dhabi in Nation Towers.

History

According to the corporate website, Charles Alexander See II (1882–1949) arrived in the United States from Canada in 1921 with his wife Florence MacLean Wilson See (1885–1956), and his widowed mother Mary Wiseman See (1854–1939). Mary See had developed the recipes that became the foundation of the See's candy business while helping run her husband's hotel on Tremont Island in Ontario.

The family opened the first See's Candies shop and kitchen at 135 North Western Avenue in Los Angeles in November 1921. They had twelve shops by the mid-1920s and operated thirty shops during the Great Depression. See's first white and black "all porcelain" store was opened in Bakersfield, California on May 1, 1941.

In 1936 See's opened a shop in San Francisco. It moved operations to make creams and truffles (60% of product sales) to South San Francisco in order to take advantage of the location's cold weather.

In 1972, the See family sold the company, which generated $4 million in pre-tax profit that year, to Berkshire Hathaway for $25 million.  On January 3, 1972, Blue Chip obtained a controlling interest in See's Candy Shops. Blue Chip later acquired 100% of See's for an overall price of $25 million. Wesco Financial Corporation was an 80.1% owned subsidiary of Blue Chip Stamps until its complete merger into Berkshire Hathaway in 2011. Warren Buffett has called See's "the prototype of a dream business." (2007)  At a 1996 luncheon in San Francisco, Charlie Munger revealed that See's was the first high quality business that Berkshire ever bought. Previous to that point, Berkshire had focused on undervalued assets that could be bought cheaply. The See's acquisition influenced their commitment to buying businesses with a strong reputation and brand recognition.

See's production and warehouse workers are unionized. 

The 'couverture' chocolate used by See's is provided by the nearby Guittard Chocolate Company, and nuts come from Mariani Nut Company of Winters, California, just about an hour and 20 minutes away. The previous largest lollipop record stood at a hefty .

In popular culture 

In 1952, Lucille Ball and Vivian Vance spent a half day at the See's Candies store on La Cienega Boulevard in Los Angeles, learning to dip chocolates and work the production line, in preparation for the "Job Switching" episode of I Love Lucy. The episode, which featured Lucy and Ethel getting jobs in a chocolate factory, became one of the most popular in the show's history.

Singer Cher was working at See's in 1962, when she met Sonny Bono; she quit her job to become his housekeeper.

In a 1987 Kidsongs video, "What I Want to Be", The Kidsongs Kids visit the See's Candies factory during "The Candy Man" song sequence.

In 1994, a driver delivering a bulk order of chocolate fell asleep while his truck was hooked up to one of the vats and pumping; the adjacent El Camino Real and Spruce Avenue were flooded with chocolate. Workers had to shovel it away from the storm drains once the fog had cooled it.

See's Candies was featured by Huell Howser in California's Gold Episode 908.

Every year the South San Francisco facility mounts oversized holiday decorations atop its plant for Christmas, Thanksgiving, Valentine's Day, Mothers' Day, and Independence Day.

On Mindy Kaling and Lang Fisher's 2020 Netflix show, Never Have I Ever, the main character, Devi Vishwakumar's mom keeps a cabinet of See's Candies as housewarming/hostess gifts.

See also

References

External links

 

1921 establishments in California
American chocolate companies
American companies established in 1921
Berkshire Hathaway
Chocolate companies based in California
Companies based in South San Francisco, California
Confectionery companies based in California
Food and drink companies established in 1921
Food and drink in the San Francisco Bay Area
Retail companies established in 1921
1972 mergers and acquisitions
South San Francisco, California